The equestrian competitions at the 2017 Southeast Asian Games in Kuala Lumpur were held at Putrajaya Equestrian Park and Terengganu International Endurance Park.

The 2017 Games feature competitions in six events (all events for mixed).

Events
The following events will be contested:

Schedule

Officials
The following officials were appointed to officiate during the SEA-Games.

Dressage
  Freddy Leyman (Ground Jury President)
  Jane Ventura (Ground Jury Member)
  Susan Hobson (Ground Jury Member)
  Peter Holler (Ground Jury Member)
  Kirsten Soegaard (Ground Jury Member)
  Mary Seefried (Technical Delegate)

Jumping
  Mou Soon Yap (Ground Jury President)
  Nai Yue Ho (Ground Jury Member)
  Steven Cesar Gamboa Virata (Ground Jury Member)
  Pakin Chamswad (Ground Jury Member)
  Rakshan Radpour (Technical Delegate)

Endurance
  Phuttiphat Sethchaivuth (Ground Jury President)
  Hamdan Mohd (Ground Jury Member)
  Aye Thetta (Ground Jury Member)
  Peter Tan Choon Heng (Ground Jury Member)
  Sundar Rethinavel (Technical Delegate)

Participation

Participating nations

Medal summary

Medal table

Medalists

Notes

See also
Polo at the 2017 Southeast Asian Games

References

External links
  
 

2017
Equestrian at the 2017 Southeast Asian Games